is a 2006 television series mainly based on the Sengoku Jieitai movie in 1979 and the 2005 movie Sengoku Jieitai 1549. Its director, Kōsei Saitō, had been involved in the creation of the Sengoku Jietai 1979 movie.

Plot
After war games were completed in the Fuji Training Ground, a mysterious storm sends First Lieutenant Akiyoshi Iba and his subordinates to the Warring States Period, 400 years from the present time. Stranded, Iba wants to return to the present with the rest of his units. However another officer by the name of First Lieutenant Takuya Shimamura had wanted to alter the past in order to change the modern times when they head back. But as the days go on, the platoons find themselves under constant threats from the Samurai, with most of the soldiers being killed individually in ambushes and surprise attacks by the former and later, by Ninjas. The rest were wiped out in a surprise attack against Iba's camp, after Shimamura had been executed by decapitation, by a combination of Archers and Arquebusers.

In the end of movie, there only 2 survivor left . Miyashita from the Shimamura platoon live with his lover and the child together in the past time meanwhile another survivor, Sergeant Fukami Moe, had been able to return to the present after the same storm had brought her back from the Sengoku period. Unfortunately, she had lost most of her memory due to the traumatic experience that she had seen since most of her fellow soldiers and First Lieutenants Shimamura and Iba were killed in the Sengoku period, as well as being the only survivor when police had found her. Sergeant Moe, in the end, is seen to be a mute, wandering about the streets of Tokyo. Iba's wife mourns his death after his daughter discovers Iba's JGSDF Dog tags in a temple.

Cast

Heisei period characters

Iba Platoon
 Takashi Sorimachi: First Lieutenant Akiyoshi Iba
 Eriko Sato:Sergeant (Medical Sergeant) Moe Fukami, who fell in love with Mitsuo Yamase
 Ken Kaido:Sergeant First Class Mitsuo Yamase
 Hiroyuki Ikeuchi:Master Sergeant Mamoru Kano who sides with Shimamura first and later join Iba, killed by Honda's forces
 Shunsuke Nakamura:Sergeant First Class (Reconnaissance Sergeant) Keiichi Kajimoto, killed while he was rescuing Omaki's family with Shimizu
 Shou Tomota:Sergeant (Reconnaissance Sergeant) Toru Shimizu, killed by Honda's forces
 Yasufumi Hayashi:Sergeant Yasuyuki Koda who sides with Shimamura first and later join Iba, killed by Honda's forces

Shimamura Platoon
 Atsurou Watabe:First Lieutenant Takuya Shimamura/ Ishida Jibu Shouyuu Mitsunari
 Hiroshi Fuse:Sergeant Shinichi Miyashita, who fell in love with Oaki
 Emiri Henmi:Sergeant First Class Yoko Naoi, killed while she was covering Shimamura's retreat
 Daijiro Kawaoka:Sergeant Hideo Ukita, killed by Fukushima Masanori(?) forces
 Kouta Kusano:Master Sergeant Michitaka Hayashi, killed while he was covering Shimamura's retreat
 :Arai
 :Kiriyama
 :Asada
 :Sergeant Toshio Kumazawa

On the tank
 Osamu Bonchi:Sergeant Major (Chief Tankman) Takeshi Inagaki, sides with Shimamura
 :Wakisaka, sides with Shimamura

On the helicopter
 :1st Lieutenant (Pilot) Toyohiko Egawa, sides with Shimamura and killed by Tasuke special forces
 :2nd Lieutenant (Copilot) Kengo Hiyama, sides with Iba, killed by Honda's forces
 :Sergeant First Class (Ground man) Minoru Kawagoe, sides with Shimamura and killed by Tasuke special forces

Other characters
 Ayako Kawahara:Kaoru Iba
 Yuuki Yagi:Yu Iba / O-rin
 :Koba killed with another fellow by Kobayakawa force's under Fukushima Masanori(?)'s leadership
 Kento Handa:Sergeant Masaya Kuroki, the 2nd soldier to die, killed by Fukushima Masanori's soldiers
 :Sergeant First Class Takayuki Matsumura, the first soldier to be killed by Ukita Hideie's(?) soldiers
 Asaharu Hasegawa:Sergeant Koji Muto, the 3rd to die in ambush

Keichō era of the Sengoku period characters
 Tatsuya Fujiwara: Kobayakawa Hideaki, the lord of Chikuzen, nephew of Kōdai-in
 Miho Shiraishi: O-shino, elder sister of Kobayakawa, niece of Kōdai-in
 :Yohei
 :Oyone
 Taro Ishida:Hiraoka Yorikatsu
 Noboru Mitsuya: Old man

The Western people
 Naoto Takenaka: Ishida Mitsunari, the fox
 Kumiko Akiyoshi: Lady Yodo
 : Toyotomi Hideyori
 Hiroki Matsukata: Shima Sakon Kazutake, Ishida Mitsunari's chief retainer
 :Mōri Terumoto
 :Ukita Hideie
 :Ōtani Yoshitsugu
 :Shimazu Yoshihiro
 Ai Maeda:O-maki, who fell in love with Keiichi Kajimoto
 Mayuko Iwasa:O-sen, who fell in love with Koji Muto
 Chikako kaku:O-aki, who fell in love with Shinichi Miyashita

The Eastern people
 Masahiko Tsugawa:Tokugawa Ieyasu/Tokugawa Naifu/Old racoon
 Yuko Kotegawa: Kōdai-in (Nene), lady Toyotomi, the regent's wife Tokugawa's concubine
 Hiroyuki Nagato:Honda Masanobu/ Namu Namu
 Kaneko Sayaka:Tasuke, a woman ninja/shinobi
 Keiko Oginome: Acha no Tsubone
 Kataoka Jyouzaemon

Theme Songs
 Love to Say and Yesterday by Satomi (Aozora Records)

Media Release
A DVD based on the show was released to the public on June 21, 2006. Aside from the inclusion of the series, it also had deleted scenes in it.

See also
 Sengoku Jietai
 Sengoku Jieitai 1549

References

External links
 Official Site 

2006 Japanese television series debuts
2006 Japanese television series endings
Japanese drama television series
Japanese science fiction television series
Sengoku period in fiction